Club Natació Catalunya is a Spanish swimming and water polo from Barcelona established in 1931. It also has athletics, squash and triathlon sections.

Catalunya's golden era started in 1987, winning the national cup and reaching the Cup Winners' Cup's final, lost to Mornar Split. It lasted through the first half of the 1990s, winning the 1992 Cup Winners' Cup and the 1995 European Cup. It also reached the European Cup's final in 1989 and 1994, losing to Spandau 04 and Újpesti TE. In 1997 and 1998 it won its sixth national cup and its seventh national championships, its last titles to date. Its women's team also won two championship in 1989 and 1991.

Titles
 Men:
 European Cup (1)
 1995
 Cup Winners' Cup (1)
 1992
 European Supercups (2)
 1992, 1995
 División de Honor (8)
 1988, 1989, 1990, 1992, 1993, 1994, 1998
 Copa del Rey (7)
 1987, 1988, 1990, 1992, 1994, 1997
 Women:
 División de Honor (2)
 1989, 1991

References

External links
Official website

Water polo clubs in Catalonia
Sports clubs established in 1931
Sports clubs in Barcelona